Mooncat was a puppet character who, as his name suggests, was a cat from the moon. He appeared on ITV from 1981 to 1985 in the series Get Up and Go! and the follow-up Mooncat and Co produced by Yorkshire Television.

Mooncat was created, designed, and initially operated and voiced by David Claridge, who later went on to create, voice and operate Roland Rat.

Get Up and Go!
Get Up And Go! was presented by Beryl Reid and Stephen Boxer. Mooncat was designed, operated and voiced by David Claridge, who went on to create, voice and operate Roland Rat.

The series revolved around Mooncat learning about life on Earth. Subjects covered included shapes, movement, being careful and taking turns. 

The format regularly included Reid and Boxer explaining an everyday subject to Mooncat and looking at a film about it on his Moon Machine through either the round, square or triangle screen. Then there would be a story about Billie, a little girl who had toys which came to life - these were Woodley a dog (presumably real), Monkey, Mrs Pinkerton-Trunks an elephant and Mr Milford Haven, a lion. This was usually narrated by Reid but occasionally by Boxer who accompanied the story with dramatic piano riffs in the style of an old black-and-white movie. 

A song would then follow with music composed and played by Stephen Boxer on guitar before the episode was wrapped. Initially, Reid, Boxer and Mooncat lived in the same house but, as the series progressed with Stephen going to live and work in a playgroup. Despite this, Boxer continued as a co-presenter often talking about his work at the playgroup with an accompanying short film of this.

 Series 1: 27 editions - 9 April 1981 – 24 December 1981
 Series 2: 20 editions - 25 February 1982 – 8 July 1982
 Series 3: 9 editions -  6 January 1983 – 3 March 1983

Transmission Guide

Series 1 (1981)
Starting the Day – 9 April 1981
Having a Pet – 16 April 1981
Girls and Boys - 23 April 1981
Age - 30 April 1981
Weather - 7 May 1981
Water - 14 May 1981
Making Friends - 21 May 1981
New Baby - 28 May 1981
Family - 4 June 1981
Games - 11 June 1981
Shopping - 18 June 1981
Housework - 25 June 1981
Starting School (1) - 20 August 1981
Starting School (2) - 27 August 1981
Books - 3 September 1981
Letter - 10 September 1981
Manners - 17 September 1981
Picnic - 24 September 1981
Body - 1 October 1981
Feeling Ill - 8 October 1981
Clothes - 15 October 1981
Voice Sounds - 22 October 1981
Funny - 29 October 1981
Angry - 5 November 1981
Pretending - 12 November 1981
Lost and Found - 17 December 1981
Christmas - 24 December 1981

Series 2 (1982)
Where We Live – 25 February 1982
Decorating – 4 March 1982
Which Room? – 11 March 1982
Shapes – 18 March 1982
Spaces - 25 March 1982
Measuring - 1 April 1982
Growing Things - 8 April 1982
Springtime - 15 April 1982
Being Careful - 22 April 1982
Using Tools - 29 April 1982
Weighing - 6 May 1982
Rubbish and Jumble - 13 May 1982
Washday - 20 May 1982
Movement - 27 May 1982
Busy - 3 June 1982
Creepy Crawlies - 10 June 1982
Food - 17 June 1982
Milk - 24 June 1982
Money - 1 July 1982
Broken - 8 July 1982

Series 3 (1983)
Just a Minute - 6 January 1983
Dreams - 13 January 1983
Dressing Up - 20 January 1983
I Wish - 27 January 1983
Choosing - 3 February 1983
Alone - 10 February 1983
Surprises - 17 February 1983
Happy - 24 February 1983
New Job - 19 May 1983
Moving Out - 26 May 1983
Asking Questions - 2 June 1983
Window Cleaner - 9 June 1983
Which One? - 16 June 1983
Rainy Day - 23 June 1983
Taking Turns - 30 June 1983
A Day Out - 7 July 1983
Glass - 14 July 1983
Everything In Its Place - 21 July 1983
Night - 28 July 1983
Mistakes - 4 August 1983
Party-11 August 1983
Upside Down - 18 August 1983
Push and Pull - 25 August 1983
Singing - 1 September 1983
Parcels - 8 September 1983
Wheels - 15 September 1983
Printing - 22 September 1983
Flying - 29 September 1983
Policeman-6 October 1983
Collecting Things-13 October 1983
Sounds and Noises - 20 October 1983
Machines - 27 October 1983
Winter - 3 November 1983

Mooncat and Co
In June 1984 the format changed. Reid left and Claridge also departed the series, as by this time he was now providing the voice and puppeteering for Roland Rat on the (then) recently-launched TV-am service; he was replaced by Christopher Leith (later notable for his work in the blockbuster film Who Framed Roger Rabbit) as the puppeteer and voice of Mooncat.

In order to accommodate these changes, the series title was changed to Mooncat and Co. and a new format was devised. The storyline now had Stephen and Mooncat living in a junk shop which Stephen ran. The Moon Machine was abolished, and Mooncat now had regular contact with the outside world - for example, trips out to purchase the subject of the episode such as a telephone or a new carpet. The 'Beryl' role was filled by a different guest in every episode; these guests included Pam Ayres, Patsy Rowlands, Wilf Lunn and Kenny Lynch. But probably the most memorable was Pat Coombs whose eponymous character was a WPC. The stories continued to be written by Shirley Isherwood who had written the Billie stories but now featured other characters which changed from week to week though there were some regulars such as Robert and his pet alien Grimond. 

Stephen Boxer eventually left and was replaced by Opportunity Knocks finalist Berni Flint, although Boxer's face remained on the opening credits as the storyline gave a reason for his prolonged absence. The series ended on 26 September 1985, in part due to declining viewing figures following Boxer's departure; with Boxer expressing no desire to return or make any further episodes in 1986, the Mooncat character was discontinued completely. A week later, Mooncat and Co was replaced by Puddle Lane.

 Series 1: 25 editions - 5 July 1984 – 20 December 1984
 Series 2: 7 editions - 14 March 1985 – 25 April 1985

Both Mooncat series were written by Rick Vanes.

External links 
 Rick Vanes' website
 BFI Film and TV database

Fictional cats
1980s British children's television series
Puppets